Fort Lauderdale, Florida, unlike many cities in the United States, has an official program for recognizing official neighborhoods. Under the Neighborhood Organization Recognition Program,  over 60 distinct neighborhoods have received official recognition from the city. An additional 25-30 neighborhoods exist without official recognition, although the city's neighborhood map displays them as well.

References

External links
 Map of Fort Lauderdale neighborhoods (.pdf file, City of Fort Lauderdale website)
 Neighborhood Association Contact List

 
Geography of Fort Lauderdale, Florida